Solute carrier family 22 member 1 is a protein that in humans is encoded by the gene SLC22A1.

Function 

Polyspecific organic cation transporters in the liver, kidney, intestine, and other organs are critical for elimination of many endogenous small organic cations as well as a wide array of drugs and environmental toxins. This gene is one of three similar cation transporter genes located in a cluster on chromosome 6. The encoded protein contains twelve putative transmembrane domains and is a plasma integral membrane protein. Two transcript variants encoding two different isoforms have been found for this gene, but only the longer variant encodes a functional transporter.

It is also required for the uptake of metformin by cells.

See also 
 Solute carrier family
 Organic cation transport proteins

References

Further reading 

 
 
 
 
 
 
 
 
 
 
 
 
 
 
 
 
 
 
 

Solute carrier family